Raymond Kissam Price Jr. (May 6, 1930 – February 13, 2019) was an American writer who was the chief speechwriter for U.S. President Richard Nixon, working on both inaugural addresses, his resignation speech, and Gerald Ford's pardon speech. During Nixon's presidential campaign of 1968, the candidate made use of the contrasting style of two speechwriters (the other being Pat Buchanan) with Price becoming known to colleagues as Mr Outside because his work was aimed at broadening Nixon's appeal.

A native of New York City, Price graduated from Yale University in 1951. There, he was a member of the Conservative Party of the Yale Political Union and also belonged to Skull and Bones.

Price wrote a retrospective on the presidency titled With Nixon and assisted Nixon in the writing of several books. John Dean mentioned Price as one person suspected (falsely) of having been Deep Throat. For 19 years, Price was a member of the Economic Club of New York.

Career

Collier's magazine, New York City, assistant to editor, 1955–1957
Life magazine, New York City, reporter, 1957
New York Herald Tribune, New York City, member of editorial staff, 1957–1964, editor of editorial page, 1964–1966
assistant to Richard M. Nixon, 1967–1969, special assistant, 1969–1973, special consultant, 1973–1974, 1980. Writer. Chief speechwriter for President Nixon
Fellow at John F. Kennedy Institute of Politics, Harvard University, 1977
visiting fellow at American Enterprise Institute, 1977
Nixon Professor at Whittier College, Whittier, California, 1978.

Other memberships
Aurelian Honor Society
Economic Club of New York
Federal City Club
The Metropolitan Club
Overseas Press Club of America
Skull and Bones
Yale Club of New York City

Further reading
 The New York Times Book Review, November 20, 1977;
 Newsweek, November 28, 1977;
 New York Review of Books, April 6, 1978.

References

External links
PBS Biography

C-SPAN Q&A interview with Price, December 28, 2008

1930 births
2019 deaths
Ray Price
Deaths from cerebrovascular disease
Harvard Kennedy School staff
Nixon administration personnel
White House Directors of Speechwriting
Writers from New York City
Yale University alumni